Louga Basket Club, also known simply as Louga or LBC, is a Senegalese basketball club based in Louga. The team competes in the Nationale 1, the highest national level.

History
The club Louga BC was founded after the merger of Ndiambour Basket and Union Sportif de Louga (USL) in 2007. The two teams played in the lower levels of basketball before.

Later, Moustapha Diop, mayor of Louga, became the team's main sponsor and invested more than CFA 30 million in the team.

In 2016, Louga won the Senegalese Basketball Cup, the first trophy in club history and became the first team from the Louga Region to win a national trophy. Mouhamadou Lamine Diop was named the final MVP.

Honours
Senegalese Basketball Cup
Champions (1): 2016

Season by season

References

Basketball teams in Senegal
Basketball teams established in 2007
2007 establishments in Senegal
Louga Region